The 1948 Ashgabat earthquake was on 6 October with a surface wave magnitude of 7.3 and a maximum Mercalli intensity of X (Extreme), in Turkmenistan near Ashgabat. Due to censorship by the Soviet government, the event was not widely reported in the USSR's media. Historians tend to agree that the ban on reporting the extent of the casualties and damage did not allow the Soviet government to allocate enough financial resources to respond adequately. It was the strongest earthquake recorded in Turkmenistan.

Details 
The Ashgabat earthquake struck at 1:12 a.m. on October 6, 1948. The epicenter of the earthquake was near the small village of Gara-Gaudan, 25 kilometres southwest of Ashgabat. The earthquake caused extreme damage in Ashgabat and nearby villages, where almost all brick buildings collapsed, concrete structures were heavily damaged, and freight trains were derailed. There were damage and casualties in Darreh Gaz, Iran. Surface rupture was observed northwest and southeast of Ashgabat. Media sources vary on the number of the casualties, from 10,000 to 110,000, equivalent to almost 10% of the Turkmen SSR's population at the time.

According to memories of survivors, the city's infrastructure was badly damaged, with the exception of water pipes. Telephone and telegraph service was cut. The city aerodrome's landing strip was cracked.

Electricity was restored six days after the earthquake. The railway station began functioning on the third day. Because most motor vehicles were stored either under the open sky or in light plywood garages, most trucks and passenger automobiles were undamaged and proved critical to delivery of medicine and medical supplies from a destroyed pharmaceutical warehouse. All hospitals were destroyed, so medical treatment was rendered on the municipal parade ground "under the trees".

This earthquake killed future Turkmen president Saparmurat Niyazov's mother Gurbansoltan Eje (his father having died during World War II) and the rest of his family, leaving him an orphan. Aid to victims, as well as restoration of basic needs and infrastructure, was provided by the Soviet Army.

See also 
List of earthquakes in 1948
List of earthquakes in Iran
Halk Hakydasy Memorial Complex#Monument Ruhy Tagzym: monument to those who died in the earthquake

References

Further reading

External links

20th century in Ashgabat
1948 Ashgabat
1948 earthquakes
1948 in the Soviet Union
1948 Ashgabat
Earthquakes in Iran
Turkmen Soviet Socialist Republic
1948 in Iran
October 1948 events in Asia
1948 disasters in the Soviet Union
1948 disasters in Iran